Laurel Mall may refer to:
Laurel Mall (Maryland) in Laurel, Maryland
Laurel Mall (Pennsylvania) in Hazleton, Pennsylvania